Hsiao Uan-u (born 12 October 1973) is a Taiwanese politician.

Career
The daughter of Hsiao Teng-wang, a former speaker of Chiayi City Council, Hsiao Uan-u attended college in the United States, at California State University, Northridge and the University of San Francisco. An uncle, Hsiao Teng-shi, ran her 1998 legislative campaign, and Hsiao Uan-u won due to her family's considerable political influence in Chiayi. While in office, Hsiao Uan-u served as family spokesperson, as Hsiao Teng-piao, another paternal uncle, who, like her father, had served on the Chiayi City Council, chose to face charges of blackmail, illegal confinement, graft, and bribery. Months after Hsiao Uan-u completed her term in January 2002, Hsiao Teng-piao was paroled.

References

1973 births
Living people
20th-century Taiwanese women politicians
Members of the 4th Legislative Yuan
Chiayi County Members of the Legislative Yuan
California State University, Northridge alumni
University of San Francisco alumni
Kuomintang Members of the Legislative Yuan in Taiwan
21st-century Taiwanese women politicians